Nianell (born September 25, 1971 as Sonia Aletta Nel in Omaruru, Namibia) is a singer, pianist, guitarist, and composer.

Biography
After growing up in Windhoek, Nianell graduated with a three-year diploma in light music from Pretoria Technikon in South Africa. She studied classical music at Trinity College in London and at the University of South Africa.
 
She has a four-octave vocal range and her songs have been described as including "elements of folk, pop, R&B, country, classic and even Celtic music." Four of her albums (Who Painted The Moon?, Angel Tongue, Life's Gift, and I Know I'm Lucky) reached platinum status in South Africa. Nianell gained her first international platinum hit with the song "Who Painted the Moon?" The composition was covered by another international singer, Hayley Westernra on the album Pure. The album sold more than 2 million copies and Nianell's version was featured as a single on this album. In April 2011, she released her first album in the United States. She has won two SAMA Awards: Angel Tongue won Best English Contemporary Album, and "We'll Find a Way" won her Best Female Songwriter.

She released a duet album with Dozi and another duet album with Afropop artists Romanz in May 2011.

Personal life
She and her ex-husband, Andrew Thompson, have triplets, all girls. In 1998, she played netball in the Namibian national team. Nianell's younger sister, Riana Nel, is also an acclaimed singer and songwriter. Both sisters have performed together on several occasions.

Discography

Albums
2002 – Who Painted the Moon
2006 – Life's Gift
2007 – Angel Tongue
2007 – As One (Live DVD, concert at Emperor's Palace)
2008 – I Know I'm Lucky
2009 – It Takes Two, with Dozi (DVD)
2010 – Sand & Water
2011 – Who Painted the Moon (U.S. compilation album)
2011 – 'N Duisend Drome
2012 – You're the One That I Want – Take 2
2012 – My Heart
2014 – Just Be

References

1971 births
Living people
People from Omaruru
21st-century Namibian women singers
Musicians from Windhoek
University of South Africa alumni
Namibian expatriates in South Africa